George William Burdett Clare VC (18 May 1889 – 29 November 1917) was an English recipient of the Victoria Cross, the highest and most prestigious award for gallantry in the face of the enemy that can be awarded to British and Commonwealth forces.

Clare was born on 18 May 1889 in St Ives, Huntingdonshire to George and Rhoda Clare.

He was 28 years old, and a private in the 5th Lancers (Royal Irish), he was awarded the Victoria Cross for his actions on 28/29 November 1917 at Bourlon Wood, France during the Battle of Cambrai at which he was killed.

Citation

His Victoria Cross will be displayed at The Royal Lancers and Nottinghamshire Yeomanry Museum at Thoresby Park, Nottinghamshire

He is commemorated  on the Cambrai Memorial to the Missing, France; in St Peter and St Paul's Church, Chatteris, Cambridgeshire and on Chatteris War Memorial. The local doctors surgery in the town of Chatteris has adopted his name. A pictures and small dedication can be found on the wall of the waiting room of the George Clare Surgery.

References

External links
 

1889 births
1917 deaths
5th Royal Irish Lancers soldiers
British World War I recipients of the Victoria Cross
British military personnel killed in World War I
British Army personnel of World War I
People from St Ives, Cambridgeshire
British Army recipients of the Victoria Cross
Military personnel from Cambridgeshire